Krasnohorivka is a city in Donetsk Oblast (province) of Ukraine occupied by Russia. Population:  16,714 (2001).

History 

The town was founded in the first half of the 19th century by migrants from the Ukrainian villages of Poltava Governorate and Kharkov Governorate.

Starting mid-April 2014 pro-Russian separatists captured several towns in Donetsk Oblast; including Krasnohorivka. On 1 August 2014 Ukrainian forces had liberated the city from pro-Russian separatists. The town then became situated close to the frontline with the separatist-controlled Donetsk. It continued to come under separatist attack by shelling.

June 2015 offensive

On 3 June 2015 fresh violence returned to the town as pro-Russian rebels launched an offensive there, involving 1,000 troops, tanks and heavy artillery. The rebels stated they only engaged in defence measures after an assault by the Ukrainian army. Video footage showed outgoing artillery fire originating in residential areas in Donetsk held by the rebels, directed at Ukrainian government positions, a violation of both the Minsk II agreement and Geneva Conventions. The attacking rebel forces included a number of Russian regular soldiers. Ukrainian government accused Russia of inciting the conflict. Western diplomats stated that the assault was carried out by combined Russian-separatist forces.

Notable people
 Mykola Shmatko (1943–2020), a Ukrainian sculptor, professor and painter.

References

Cities in Donetsk Oblast
Yekaterinoslav Governorate
Cities of district significance in Ukraine
Populated places established in the Russian Empire
Pokrovsk Raion